Rhys Yates (born in Chesterfield on 6 May 1992) is a British rally driver currently competing in WRC-2 for M-Sport Ford World Rally Team in a Ford Fiesta R5 Mk. II.

Rally career
Brought up in a motorsport environment, Rhys started in motorcycle racing and motocross before switching to rallying in 2013.

Rhys joined multiple World Rally Championship-winning squad M-Sport Ford World Rally Team for the 2020 season, where he would drive a latest-specification, factory-prepared and run Ford Fiesta R5 Mk. II. He opened his account with a fourth-place at the 2020 Monte Carlo Rally.

Then coronavirus came and actual competition ceased. Demonstrating his flexibility and ability to rise to a challenge, Rhys stepped into sim racing, taking on vastly more experienced eGamers to win the World Rally Championship's Esports WRC Shootout.

Yates currently participates in the British Rally Championship, using a M-Sport prepared Ford Fiesta Rally2

Career results

WRC results 

* Season still in progress

WRC-2 results 

* Season still in progress

References

External links

Rhys Yates's e-wrc profile

1992 births
Living people
British rally drivers
English rally drivers
World Rally Championship drivers
Sportspeople from Chesterfield, Derbyshire
Toksport WRT drivers
M-Sport drivers